Greffin Affagart (born around 1490 or 1495, died around 1557), was a  French nobleman, seigneur de Courteilles du Bois (or de Nocé) in Maine, author of a pilgrim's story in Holy Land.

Biography 
Greffin Affagart travelled to Holy Land twice and recounted his impressions in a manuscript called Relation de la Terre Sainte (1533/1534). 

Starting from Chartres, Greffin Affagart crossed France and Italy from the north to reach Venice, in search of a maritime passage to the Holy Land. Fourteen years later, in 1533, he left Marseille for a similar pilgrimage which would take him along the Italian then Greek coasts, passing near Crete, to Rhodes and Cyprus, then Alexandria before reaching Jaffa.

Affagart’s main goal was to write a guide for the  pilgrim in the Holy Land. He wanted to prevent Christians from giving up too easily when undertaking the journey to the Holy Land, and to show them that, despite the great difficulties, the pilgrimage was feasible. His account is condensed in a small simple and precise treatise with information on the diversity of the countries, languages, currencies, the dangers by sea and by land, the way of living of different "sects" of Christians, the distances between places, that might be useful to a traveller.

Extracts

References

1400s births
Year of birth uncertain
1550s deaths
Year of death uncertain
Place of birth unknown
15th-century French nobility
16th-century French nobility
Christian pilgrimages
Holy Land travellers